The Azerbaijan men's national under-16 basketball team is a national basketball team of Azerbaijan, administered by the Azerbaijan Basketball Federation.
It represents the country in men's international under-16 basketball competitions.

Championship participations
2016 FIBA U16 European Championship Division C – 2nd place
2017 FIBA U16 European Championship Division C – 3rd place
2018 FIBA U16 European Championship Division C – 6th place

See also
Azerbaijan national basketball team
Azerbaijan national under-18 basketball team

References

External links
Archived records of Azerbaijan team participations

Azerbaijan national basketball team
Men's national under-16 basketball teams